Gridley High School is a public high school in Gridley, California, United States, a city north of Sacramento and south of Redding.

Academics
As of 2013, Gridley High School operates on an 8:00 a.m. to 3:06 p.m. schedule. The only exception is on Wednesdays, when the school starts at 8:00 a.m. as usual, but ends at 1:54 p.m.

Enrollment
Gridley High School had an enrollment of about 599 students in the 2016-2017 school year.

The school is very integrated. In the school year 2011-2012, the student body was 0.4% American Indian/Alaska Native, 3.4% Asian, 0.1% Native Hawaiian/Pacific Islander, 0.4% Filipino, 50.4% Hispanic, 1.4% Black, and 43.1% White.

Athletics
Gridley High School offers 13 sport teams, including baseball, softball, basketball, swimming, football, wrestling, volleyball, track & field, golf, soccer, cross country, tennis, and cheerleading.

Notable alumni
Leslie Deniz – is a class of 1980 athlete who competed in the 1984 Olympics in Los Angeles.  She competed in shot put and discus and won a silver medal in women's discus.

References

External links

High schools in Butte County, California
Gridley, California
Public high schools in California
Educational institutions established in 1895
1895 establishments in California